As per Lithuanian traffic act § 15, the general maximum speed limits in Lithuania are:

 50 km/h in built-up areas
 70 km/h on unpaved or cobblestone roads outside of built-up areas.
 90 km/h on asphalt or concrete roads outside of built-up areas
 110 km/h on both motorway and expressway during period between 1 November and 31 March.
 120 km/h on expressway (greitkelis) during period between 1 April and 31 October.
 130 km/h on motorway (automagistralė) during period between 1 April and 31 October.

The limits shown above apply unless otherwise stated, as road signs may prescribe a lower or a higher speed limit (e.g. electronic variable signs during lower speed period on motorways showing higher speed limit if driving conditions are satisfactory).

Different limits apply to cars towing trailers, trucks and buses.

References

Lithuania
Road transport in Lithuania